Andalusian nationalism is the nationalism that asserts that Andalusians are a nation and promotes the cultural unity of Andalusians. In the past it was considered to be represented primarily by the Andalusian Party. However, the party disbanded in 2015; there are also lesser political organisations that identify with Andalusian nationalism. Some political forces without parliamentary presence like Nación Andaluza and Asamblea Nacional de Andalucía may be found advocating independence. There is also a movement defending the idea that Andalusian is not a dialect of Spanish, but a language of its own.

Brief history

The predecessor of Andalusian nationalism is the peasant anarchism which was quite active during the 19th century. During the reign of Isabella II of Spain, Andalusia was a hotbed of anarchist insurgency. Later, these anarchist cores became protagonists in conflicts between local people and Madrid.

With the declaration of the First Spanish Republic in 1873, various nationalist currents began to emerge in Andalusia. In 1883, an assembly gathered at Antequera drafted a constitution styling Andalusia as an autonomous republic inside a federal state (República Andaluza o Estado libre o autónomo de Andalucía, in Spanish). This constitution is known as Constitución Federal de Antequera.

Blas Infante, a Georgist idealist and founder of modern Andalusian nationalism, initiated an assembly at Ronda in 1918. This assembly adopted a charter based on Antequera Constitution and also adopted the current flag and emblem as "national symbols". During the Second Spanish Republic, the Andalucismo was represented by the Junta Liberalista, a federalist political party led by Infante.

Andalusian nationalism was revived when Alianza Socialista de Andalucía or ASA (Socialist Alliance of Andalusia) was founded in 1971, at the last period of Francoism in Spain. Andalusian nationalism drew limited but considerable support from the western part of Andalusia, particularly from provincial capitals like Cádiz and Seville. In recent years, there has been a current arguing that the Andalusian dialect is actually an independent language and not a subset of Spanish.

The road to autonomy
After dictator Francisco Franco's death, the new Spanish Constitution of 1978 established in its Article 2 the right of "regions and nationalities" to self-government. This followed a popular outcry in Andalusia for its own right to autonomy, with a total of over a million and a half people demonstrating in the streets of most Andalusian towns and cities on 4 December 1977, while the constitution was still being drafted. This campaign would lead to the inclusion of two articles regarding autonomy in the finished constitution text: Article 143, which would give all Spanish regions the chance to become autonomous communities, with fewer devolved powers; and Article 151, that would set the roles of autonomous communities with a higher degree of autonomy.

Article 151 was automatically applicable to the so-called historic nationalities, which have previously enjoyed autonomy during the Second Spanish Republic, as reflected in the Spanish Constitution of 1931. Nevertheless, this article also offered the possibility of other regions or nationalities accessing the same level of autonomy if approved on referendum.

A separate statute of autonomy for Andalusia had been written by Blas Infante and submitted, approved by parliament in June 1936, to be voted in referendum in September 1936. However the start of the Civil War in July and the assassination of Infante by Franco's rebels in August of the same year put an end to the autonomist project for Andalusia.

In spite of this, Andalusia was never recognised as a "historic nationality" in the 1978 constitution. This caused a great deal of indignation at the time and fired the fuse of a popular campaign which would lead the region seeking autonomy under the vía rápida (fast route) proposed for the historic nationalities by article 151 of the Spanish constitution. The "fast route" required an approved referendum by an absolute majority of all eligible voters in the region as well as in each constituent province. The referendum vote on 28 February 1980 did succeed in gaining the absolute majority of eligible voters in the proposed region, and in all provinces except for Almería, where it fell just short of a majority of all "eligible voters". Due to this,  Andalusia could not achieve autonomous status under the "fast route" proposed by the Spanish constitution.

In response to this situation, where a clear majority of voters wished for autonomy to be granted to the region but fell short of the actual requirements of the chosen autonomy process, the Spanish Congress of Deputies passed "Ley 13/1980" allowing for the substitution of the approval by the deputies and senators of Almeria province instead the required approval of an absolute majority of the voters of the province. The new Statute of Autonomy was approved by the Spanish parliament in 1981 under the requirements of article 151.

A proposal for the reform of the Statute of Autonomy for Andalusia was finalised by the Andalusian Parliament in May 2006. After being debated and posteriorly approved in the Spanish Parliament, the original wording of the statute was amended to define Andalusia as a "Nacionalidad" (Historic Nationality). This has led to severe criticism by the Andalusist Party and other political forces for falling short of the steps taken in the 2006 Statute of Autonomy of Catalonia, where this territory defined itself as a Nation.

The amended text was approved by both the Senate of Spain and the Congress of Deputies of Spain and was voted in referendum on February 18, 2007.

Gallery

See also
Autonomous communities of Spain
Andalusist Party
Andalusian language movement
Nationalities in Spain
Andalusian Liberation
Unitarian Candidacy of Workers

References

External links

History
 History of Andalucismo
 Biography and thought of Blas Infante, Blas Infante Memorial Foundation

Political parties and unions
 Andalucista Party, in Spanish.
 Socialist Party of Andalusia (refounded), in Spanish.
 Asamblea Nacional de Andalucía, in Spanish.
 Nación Andaluza, in Spanish.
 Major standpoints of Nación Andaluza (in English)
 CUT-BAI, a nationalist trade union, in Spanish.
 Somos Andaluces